Richard Dodrieux (born 22 March 1947) is a French field hockey player. He competed in the men's tournament at the 1968 Summer Olympics.

References

External links
 

1947 births
Living people
French male field hockey players
Olympic field hockey players of France
Field hockey players at the 1968 Summer Olympics
People from Cambrai
Sportspeople from Nord (French department)